Scener is the second solo release from Swedish pop singer and songwriter Per Gessle., released on 25 October 1985. The album peaked at number 39 on the Swedish Albums Chart.

Track listing
LP/MC
Side-A

Side-B

Personnel
Per Gessle: Vocals, Guitars, Piano, Synthesizers
Erik Borelius, Nane Kvillsater, Janne Oldaeus, Pelle Siren: Guitars
Mats Persson: Guitars, Piano, Synthesizer, Organ
Goran Fritzson: Synthesizers
Erik Strandh: Accordion
Anders Herrlin: Bass, Synthesizers
Janne Kling: Flute
Erik Hausler: Tenor and Soprano Sax
Christina Puchlinger: Harp
Micke Andersson, Rolf Alex: Drums, Percussion
Strings arranged by Backa Hans Eriksson
Anne-Lie Rydé, Marie Fredriksson, Monica Törnell: Vocals

Charts

References

1985 albums
Per Gessle albums
EMI Records albums
Swedish-language albums